J.F. Volrad Deneke (March 8, 1920 – September 19, 2006) was a German politician of the Free Democratic Party (FDP) and former member of the German Bundestag.

Life 
Deneke was a member of the German Bundestag from 26 July 1963, when he succeeded Ernst Keller, who had died, until 1965. He had entered parliament via the state list of the FDP North Rhine-Westphalia.

Literature

References

1920 births
2006 deaths
Members of the Bundestag for North Rhine-Westphalia
Members of the Bundestag 1961–1965
Members of the Bundestag for the Free Democratic Party (Germany)